Made to Last may refer to:

Made to Last, a memoir by John Kenneth Galbraith, 1964
Made to Last: The story of Britain's best-known shoe firm, a 2013 book about Clarks Shoes
"Made to Last", song by Issues from Headspace

See also
Built to Last (disambiguation)